William Rush (July 4, 1756 – January 17, 1833) was a U.S. neoclassical sculptor from Philadelphia, Pennsylvania. He is considered the first major American sculptor.  Rush was born in Philadelphia, the fourth child of Joseph Rush, a ship's carpenter, and first wife, Rebecca Lincoln.  As a teenager, he apprenticed three years with woodcarver Edward Cutbush, and soon surpassed his master in the art of carving of ships' figureheads in wood.  He saw military service during the American Revolution, as an officer in the militia.  He opened his own wood carving business, and was in great demand when the U.S. Navy began building ships on Philadelphia.  Later in life, he took up sculpture.  Rush was one of the founders of the Pennsylvania Academy of the Fine Arts and taught sculpture there.  He was also active in local politics, serving on the Philadelphia City Council for two decades.  Rush died in Philadelphia in 1833, and is buried at The Woodlands (Philadelphia).

United States Navy
He designed the figurehead for a fifth original frigate,  (Hercules, 1796, carved by John Skillin, whereabouts unknown, replaced by a figurehead of Andrew Jackson 1848), and may have designed that for the sixth,  (George Washington, 1800, carved by Rush's former apprentice Daniel N. Train, whereabouts unknown).

Public sculpture

Rush was one of the first to create outdoor public sculpture in the United States. His twin figures, Comedy and Tragedy (1808, Philadelphia Museum of Art), were originally installed in niches on the facade of Philadelphia's Chestnut Street Theater. His Water Nymph and Bittern (1809), was created as a fountain statue for the Center Square Waterworks, designed by Benjamin Latrobe, that stood at what is now the site of Philadelphia City Hall.
The Schuylkill Permanent Bridge (Market Street Bridge) in Philadelphia was adorned with his sculptures of Agriculture and Commerce (1812, whereabouts unknown). Architect William Strickland's Philadelphia Custom House featured a figure named Commerce (1819, whereabouts unknown).

Rush's sculptures of Wisdom and Justice (by 1825, Fairmount Park Commission) decorated a triumphal arch erected in front of Independence Hall for the 1824 visit of the Marquis de Lafayette. During the Frenchman's 8-day stay in Philadelphia, Rush carved a portrait bust of Lafayette (1824, Pennsylvania Academy of the Fine Arts).

His masterpiece may have been a life-sized statue of the Crucifixion, carved for St. Augustine's Church in 1810. It was destroyed in 1844, when the church was burned during Philadelphia's anti-Catholic riots.

Rush carved allegorical figures of The Schuylkill Chained (1825) and The Waterworks (1825) for the Fairmount Waterworks. These were installed atop pavilions along the Schuylkill River. Water Nymph and Bittern was moved to the Fairmount Waterworks at about the same time. A bronze casting of the wooden Water Nymph and Bittern statue was made in 1872.

Legacy
Rush has been called the Father of American Sculpture.  His early woodworking experience translated into sculptures that were deeply undercut and visible from far away through the dramatic use of contrast and strong shadows. Rush blended American artisanal tradition and neoclassical form.

Along with his friend Charles Willson Peale, Rush helped found the Pennsylvania Academy of Fine Arts, showing his interest in art beyond the American craft tradition. At age 66, he carved a self-portrait bust (1822), that is now at PAFA. Wisdom and Justice are on loan to PAFA, whose holdings include a collection of Rush's portrait busts, a life-sized eagle statue attributed to him, and the head of the nymph from Water Nymph and Bittern.

Rush's life-sized statue of George Washington (1815), long exhibited at Independence Hall, is now at the Second Bank of the United States. Seven life-sized allegorical figures by him (1820–22) are exhibited at the Philadelphia Masonic Temple. Collections of his portrait busts can be found at the Library Company of Philadelphia and the American Philosophical Society. A ship figurehead of Peace is at the Independence Seaport Museum. A ship figurehead of Benjamin Franklin is at Yale University Art Gallery. An 1817 portrait bust of George Washington is in the collection of the Museum of the American Revolution. The statues "Exhortation" and "Praise" (1812), originally located at St. Paul's Church, were given to St. Peter's Episcopal Church in Philadelphia in 1831, along with a cluster of cherubims, also by Rush. 
 
The largest collection of Rush's work can be found at the Philadelphia Museum of Art, including Comedy, Tragedy, The Schuylkill Chained, The Waterworks, portrait busts, and the 1872 bronze casting of Water Nymph and Bittern (on loan from the Fairmount Park Commission). The museum's holdings include many of Thomas Eakins's sketches and studies related to his paintings of Rush, along with the most famous painting: William Rush Carving his Allegorical Figure of the Schuylkill River (aka William Rush and His Model), 1876–77.

Eakins and Rush
Painter Thomas Eakins (1844-1916) felt a strong affinity toward Rush. As the 1876 Centennial Exposition approached, he painted two versions of a scene showing Rush carving his Allegorical Figure of the Schuylkill River (Water Nymph and Bittern). Eakins's portrayal of Rush using a nude model may not have been historically accurate, but it was important to the painter, who made many preparatory sketches and even sculpted miniature wax figures of the people and statues in the paintings.

Late in life, Eakins returned to the subject, beginning (but not completing) two versions of Rush with a nude model. In one of his final paintings, created almost exactly a century after Rush's carving of Water Nymph and Bittern, Eakins seems to have portrayed himself as Rush.

References
Craven, Wayne. American Art. London: McGraw Hill. 2003.
Biography at encyclopedia.com

 History of the Portrait Collection, Independence National Historical Park, Doris Devine Fanelli, Volume 242, page 280 (Google eBook)
 A History of European and American Sculpture: From the Early Christian Period to the Present Day, Chandler Rathfon Post, Harvard University Press,1921, Volume 2, page 108 (Google eBook)

External links

Union List of Artist Names, Getty Vocabularies. ULAN Full Record Display for William Rush. Getty Vocabulary Program, Getty Research Institute. Los Angeles, California.

1756 births
1833 deaths
Artists from Philadelphia
Pennsylvania Academy of the Fine Arts faculty
Burials at The Woodlands Cemetery
18th-century American sculptors
18th-century American male artists
American male sculptors
19th-century American sculptors
19th-century American male artists
Philadelphia City Council members
Sculptors from Pennsylvania